Two ships of the United States Navy have been named Schley after Rear Admiral Winfield Scott Schley.

The first Schley (SS-52/SF-1), an early fleet submarine, was laid down as USS Schley and renamed AA-1 before commissioning. She was later renamed T-1 and served between 1920 and 1922.
The second Schley (DD-103) was a destroyer that served between 1918 and 1945.

United States Navy ship names